"Love Ballad" is a song by R&B/Funk band L.T.D. Jeffrey Osborne is the lead singer.

Released from their album Love to the World, it spent two weeks at number one on the R&B singles chart in November 1976, and peaked at number twenty on the Billboard Hot 100 singles chart.

Weekly charts

George Benson version

George Benson released an up-tempo rendition of "Love Ballad" in 1979.  It peaked at number three on the R&B charts and number 18 on the Billboard Hot 100.  It also reached number 12 on the Adult Contemporary chart. Benson's cover is the most successful version of the song.

Weekly charts

Year-end charts

Later versions
Tanya Blount did a well-received cover of the song on her debut album in 1993.
K-Ci & JoJo covered this song on their 1997 album Love Always.
Covered by Jeffrey Osborne and is on his 2001 Love Songs compilation album, as did with Osborne's then-drummer and frontman L.T.D.'s first Greatest Hits album in 1996 as well as the live version as the closing track from Osborne's 2000 studio album That's for Sure.
J Dilla sampled this song for De La Soul in 2004 on their LP The Grind Date.
R&B singer Ciara sampled the song on her 2004 debut album Goodies.
Patti LaBelle covered the song on her 2005 album of covers, Classic Moments.
Kenny Lattimore and Chanté Moore covered the song on their 2006 album Uncovered. 
The Temptations covered "Love Ballad" on their 2007 album Back to Front.
Drum and Bass producer Netsky sampled the song on his single "Love Has Gone" from his second album 2 released in 2012''.
Osborne's longtime collaborator George Duke made a version of the song 1989 on his album Night After Night.

References

External links
[ Song Review] on the Allmusic website
 

1976 singles
1979 singles
L.T.D. (band) songs
Jeffrey Osborne songs
George Benson songs
Songs written by Skip Scarborough
1976 songs
A&M Records singles
Warner Records singles
Song recordings produced by Mizell Brothers
Rhythm and blues ballads
1970s ballads